Giovanni Agostino Giustiniani Campi (Genoa, 1538 - Genoa, 1613) was the 78th Doge of the Republic of Genoa.

Biography 
His election as doge on November 27, 1591, according to the Genoese annals, was not somewhat shared among the representatives of the Grand Council so much so that the new doge Giovanni Agostino Giustiniani Campi was elected with a low number of votes in his favor. After the end oh his mandate, Giustiniani Campi still held various state positions until his death in Genoa in 1613.

See also 

 Republic of Genoa
 Doge of Genoa

Sources 

 Buonadonna, Sergio. Rosso doge. I dogi della Repubblica di Genova dal 1339 al 1797.

16th-century Doges of Genoa
1538 births
1613 deaths